The Ntoro is the spiritual-genetic aspect of the father which the Akan people believe is passed on to his children. These 12 Ntoro are considered inherited deities (spirits) who govern guide and protect their 12 clans patrilineally. The Akan believe that the Ntoro does not die with the father. Instead, it is passed down to the man's children, or if the children are not alive, to his nephews and nieces. The father's Ntoro represents the being of the child until the child comes of age. At this point the Ntoro along with the Sunsum and Kra explains how one interacts in the world.  The Ntoro is thus explained by Akans to be the father's characteristics and spiritual traits which can be inherited. Thus, it is the cooperation of the father's Ntoro with the mother's blood (Mogya) Abusua which is believed to form the child and mold it into the Human being.

Different Ntoro

1) Bosompra (The Tough/Strong/firm)
	
2) Bosomtwe (The Human/Kind/empathetic)
	
3) Bosomakɔm (The Fanatic)
	
4) Bosompo/Bosomnketia (The Brave/proud/courageous) 
	
5) Bosommuru (The Respectable/distinguished)
	
6) Bosomkonsi (The Virtuoso)
	
7) Bosomdwerɛbe (The Eccentric/Jittery)
	
8) Bosomayensu (The Truculent)
	
9) Bosomsika (The Fastidious)
	
10) Bosomkrete (The Chivalrous)
	
11) Bosomafram (The Liberal/Kind/empathetic) 
	
12) Bosomafi (The Chaste)

References
1. http://pdfproc.lib.msu.edu/?file=/DMC/African%20Journals/pdfs/Institue%20of%20African%20Studies%20Research%20Review/1967v3n3/asrv003003010.pdf

2. http://cec.vcn.bc.ca/rdi/kw-40.htm

Ghanaian culture
Ivorian culture
Akan culture